The Lightship is a 1963 West German thriller film directed by Ladislao Vajda and starring James Robertson Justice, Helmut Wildt, and Dieter Borsche. It is based on a story by Siegfried Lenz, which was adapted again as the 1985 film The Lightship.

The film's sets were designed by the art director Johannes Ott. It was shot at the Tempelhof Studios in Berlin and on location in Copenhagen and Malmö.

Cast

References

Bibliography

External links 
 

1963 films
1960s thriller films
German thriller films
West German films
1960s German-language films
Films directed by Ladislao Vajda
Films based on German novels
Films about ship hijackings
Bavaria Film films
Films shot at Tempelhof Studios
1960s German films